William Henry Harrison (1773–1841) was the president of the United States in 1841.

William Henry Harrison may also refer to:
 William Henry Harrison (New Zealand politician) (1831–1879)
 William Henry Harrison (Georgia politician) (fl. 1843–1871), African-American representative in the Georgia Legislature during the Reconstruction Era
 William Henry Harrison (cricketer) (1866–1936), English cricketer
 William Henry Harrison (Canadian politician) (1880–1955)
 William Henry Harrison (businessman) (1892–1956), American general
 William Henry Harrison III (1896–1990), American representative and Indiana and Wyoming state legislator
 William Henry Harrison (architect) (1897–1988), American architect in California
 William H. Harrison (Wyoming politician), (1894–1991) Wyoming state representative

See also
 William Harrison (disambiguation)
 William Hendy Harrison (1863–1939), cricketer